Shafiabad (also Romanized as Shafī‘ābād; also known as Safī‘ābād and Sharīfābād) is a village in Pain Jovin Rural District, Helali District, Joghatai County, Razavi Khorasan Province, Iran. At the 2006 census, its population was 274, in 79 families.

References 

Populated places in Joghatai County